Elizabeth Emma Arnold (born 30 March 1973) is a female English former competitive swimmer.

Swimming career
Arnold represented Great Britain at the 1992 Summer Olympics in Barcelona, Spain. Participating in the women's 400-metre and 800-metre freestyle events, she finished 25th and 17th, respectively. She represented England in the 400 and 800 metres freestyle, at the 1990 Commonwealth Games in Auckland, New Zealand. She won the 1992 ASA National Championship title in the 800 metres freestyle.

References 

1973 births
Living people
English female swimmers
English female freestyle swimmers
Olympic swimmers of Great Britain
Sportspeople from Nottingham
Swimmers at the 1992 Summer Olympics
Swimmers at the 1990 Commonwealth Games
Commonwealth Games competitors for England
20th-century English women
21st-century English women